Rhys Kennedy (born 11 October 1994) is a professional rugby league footballer who plays as a  forward for Hull Kingston Rovers in the Betfred Super League.

He played for the South Sydney Rabbitohs and Brisbane Broncos in the NRL.

Background
Kennedy was born in Moruya, New South Wales, Australia. Rhys Kennedy played his junior football with the Moruya Sharks. Kennedy is of Swiss descent.

Playing career
Kennedy played for the Melbourne Storm in the National Youth Competition in 2014.  

In 2016, Kennedy played for the Illawarra Cutters in the Intrust Super Premiership NSW competition.  In 2017, Kennedy joined foundation club North Sydney who were the feeder club side for NRL side South Sydney.  Kennedy spent two seasons playing with Norths in the Intrust Super Premiership NSW.

On March 31 2019 in Round 3 of the 2019 NRL season, Kennedy made his NRL debut for South Sydney against the Gold Coast Titans.

On June 25, Kennedy signed for the Brisbane Broncos in a deal that runs until the end of the 2020 season.He was upgraded until the end of the 2022 Nrl season.
He’s decided to play for the Hull Kingston Rovers from the 2023 Super League season, for the next two
Seasons. Standing 198 cm and weighing 110 kg, Kennedy is the tallest player in the Brisbane Broncos.

References

External links
Brisbane Broncos profile
South Sydney Rabbitohs profile
Rabbitohs 28-20 Titans

1997 births
Australian rugby league players
Australian expatriate sportspeople in England
Rugby league props
South Sydney Rabbitohs players
North Sydney Bears NSW Cup players
Brisbane Broncos players
Living people
Rugby league players from New South Wales